Vågsvåg is a village in Kinn Municipality in Vestland county, Norway.  It is located on the southern shore of the island of Vågsøy along the Vågsfjorden, a part of the main Nordfjorden.  The village looks across the fjord towards the island of Husevågøy.

References

Villages in Vestland
Kinn